EDAC may refer to:

 Excessive Dynamic Airway Collapse, a rare condition whereby the posterior wall of the trachea and bronchi is weakened resulting in significant invagination of the airways on exhalation. 
 Error detection and correction, techniques that enable reliable delivery of digital data over unreliable communication channels
 EDAC (Linux), a set of Linux kernel modules for handling hardware-related errors
 Leipzig–Altenburg Airport (ICAO code)
 1-Ethyl-3-(3-dimethylaminopropyl)carbodiimide, a water-soluble carbodiimide
 El Dorado Arts Council, an arts council in California, US
Electronic Design Automation Consortium

See also